The list shows airports that are served by China Southern Airlines as part of its scheduled passenger and cargo services. The list includes the city, country, the codes of the International Air Transport Association (IATA airport code) and the International Civil Aviation Organization (ICAO airport code), and the airport's name, with the airline's hubs, cargo and focus cities, as well as terminated stations marked.

List

References

Lists of airline destinations
China Southern Airlines